The 1st constituency of Calvados is a French legislative constituency in the Calvados département. Like the other 576 French constituencies, it elects one MP using the two-round system, with a run-off if no candidate receives over 50% of the vote in the first round.

Boundaries

The constituency includes the western suburbs and districts of the city of Caen.

Deputies

Election results

2022 

 
 
 
 
 
 
|-
| colspan="8" bgcolor="#E9E9E9"|
|-

2017

2012

2007

2002 

|- style="background-color:#E9E9E9;text-align:center;"
! colspan="2" rowspan="2" style="text-align:left;" | Candidate
! rowspan="2" colspan="2" style="text-align:left;" | Party
! colspan="2" | 1st round
! colspan="2" | 2nd round
|- style="background-color:#E9E9E9;text-align:center;"
! width="75" | Votes
! width="30" | %
! width="75" | Votes
! width="30" | %
|-
| style="background-color:" |
| style="text-align:left;" | Brigitte Le Brethon
| style="text-align:left;" | Union for a Popular Movement
| UMP
| 
| 42.88%
| 
| 50.14%
|-
| style="background-color:" |
| style="text-align:left;" | Philippe Duron
| style="text-align:left;" | Socialist Party
| PS
| 
| 36.58%
| 
| 49.86%
|-
| style="background-color:" |
| style="text-align:left;" | Maurice Heuze
| style="text-align:left;" | Front National
| FN
| 
| 5.74%
| colspan="2" style="text-align:left;" |
|-
| style="background-color:" |
| style="text-align:left;" | Etienne Adam
| style="text-align:left;" | Far Left
| EXG
| 
| 3.08%
| colspan="2" style="text-align:left;" |
|-
| style="background-color:" |
| style="text-align:left;" | Marie-Jeanne Gobert
| style="text-align:left;" | Communist
| PCF
| 
| 2.12%
| colspan="2" style="text-align:left;" |
|-
| style="background-color:" |
| style="text-align:left;" | Blaise Hersent-Lechatreux
| style="text-align:left;" | Miscellaneous Left
| DVG
| 
| 1.84%
| colspan="2" style="text-align:left;" |
|-
| style="background-color:" |
| style="text-align:left;" | Alexandra Frapier
| style="text-align:left;" | Hunting, Fishing, Nature, Traditions
| CPNT
| 
| 1.69%
| colspan="2" style="text-align:left;" |
|-
| style="background-color:" |
| style="text-align:left;" | Philippe Bonneau
| style="text-align:left;" | Citizen and Republican Movement
| MCR
| 
| 1.12%
| colspan="2" style="text-align:left;" |
|-
| style="background-color:" |
| style="text-align:left;" | Hervé Boullay Du
| style="text-align:left;" | Movement for France
| MPF
| 
| 1.11%
| colspan="2" style="text-align:left;" |
|-
| style="background-color: " |
| style="text-align:left;" | Pierre Casevitz
| style="text-align:left;" | Workers’ Struggle
| LO
| 
| 1.00%
| colspan="2" style="text-align:left;" |
|-
| style="background-color:" |
| style="text-align:left;" | J. Claude Cherrier
| style="text-align:left;" | Ecologist
| ECO
| 
| 0.96%
| colspan="2" style="text-align:left;" |
|-
| style="background-color:" |
| style="text-align:left;" | Yves Dupres
| style="text-align:left;" | National Republican Movement
| MNR
| 
| 0.93%
| colspan="2" style="text-align:left;" |
|-
| style="background-color:" |
| style="text-align:left;" | Bernard Morin
| style="text-align:left;" | Divers
| DIV
| 
| 0.64%
| colspan="2" style="text-align:left;" |
|-
| style="background-color:" |
| style="text-align:left;" | Philippe Pierrat
| style="text-align:left;" | Divers
| DIV
| 
| 0.21%
| colspan="2" style="text-align:left;" |
|-
| style="background-color:" |
| style="text-align:left;" | Martine Goulet
| style="text-align:left;" | Far Right
| EXD
| 
| 0.11%
| colspan="2" style="text-align:left;" |
|-
| style="background-color:" |
| style="text-align:left;" | Najet Matmati
| style="text-align:left;" | Miscellaneous Left
| DVG
| 
| 0.00%
| colspan="2" style="text-align:left;" |
|-
| colspan="8" style="background-color:#E9E9E9;"|
|- style="font-weight:bold"
| colspan="4" style="text-align:left;" | Total
| 
| 100%
| 
| 100%
|-
| colspan="8" style="background-color:#E9E9E9;"|
|-
| colspan="4" style="text-align:left;" | Registered voters
| 
| style="background-color:#E9E9E9;"|
| 
| style="background-color:#E9E9E9;"|
|-
| colspan="4" style="text-align:left;" | Blank/Void ballots
| 
| 1.46%
| 
| 2.38%
|-
| colspan="4" style="text-align:left;" | Turnout
| 
| 62.64%
| 
| 61.26%
|-
| colspan="4" style="text-align:left;" | Abstentions
| 
| 37.36%
| 
| 38.74%
|-
| colspan="8" style="background-color:#E9E9E9;"|
|- style="font-weight:bold"
| colspan="6" style="text-align:left;" | Result
| colspan="2" style="background-color:" | UMP GAIN FROM PS
|}

1997 

 
 
 
 
 
 
 
|-
| colspan="8" bgcolor="#E9E9E9"|
|-

References

 Official results of French elections from 2002: 

1